The 1946 Minnesota Teachers College Conference football season was the season of college football played by the six member schools of the Minnesota Teachers College Conference as part of the 1946 college football season. None of the Minnesota Teachers College Conference teams was ranked in the Associated Press poll or played in a bowl game.

Conference overview

All-conference team
The conference coaches picked an all-conference team consisting of first-team and second-team selections. The first team picks were:
 Ends: Gus Novotny, Duluth; Wallace Spielman, Mankato; Lee Hooslien, Bemidji
 Tackles: Robert Fielder, Moorhead; Wesley Olson, Duluth; Delos Wilcox, Bemidji
 Guards: George Rinelsub, Mankato; Dan Mestnick, St. Cloud; Don Peterson, Bemidji
 Center: Henry Lewer, Mankato
 Backs: Robert Galinski, Duluth; Richard Otterstad, Bemidji; Roy Walters, Mankato; Jerry Krenz, Moorhead

Teams

Mankato State

The 1946 Mankato State Indians football team was an American football team that represented Mankato State Teachers College (now known as Minnesota State University, Mankato) as a member of the Minnesota Teachers College Conference (MTCC) during the 1946 college football season. In their fifth, non-consecutive season under head coach Jim Clark, and after a three-year hiatus during World War II, the Indians compiled a 5–1–1 record (3–0–1 against MTCC opponents), tied with Duluth State for the MTCC championship, and outscored opponents by a total of 83 to 48.

Duluth State

The 1946 Duluth State Bulldogs football team was an American football team that represented Duluth State Teachers College (now known as University of Minnesota Duluth) as a member of the Minnesota Teachers College Conference (MTCC) during the 1946 college football season. Led by head coach Lloyd Peterson, the Bulldogs compiled a 3–1–2 record (2–0–2 against MTCC opponents), tied with Mankato State for the MTCC championship, and outscored opponents by a total of 60 to 33.

Bemidji State

The 1946 Bemidji State Beavers football team was an American football team that represented Bemidji State Teachers College (later renamed Bemidji State University) as a member of the Minnesota Teachers College Conference (MTCC) during the 1946 college football season. Led by head coach Hjalmer J. Erickson, the Bulldogs compiled a 3–4 record (2–2 against MTCC opponents), tied for third place in the MTCC, and were outscored by a total of 90 to 76.

St. Cloud State

The 1946 St. Cloud State Huskies football team was an American football team that represented St. Cloud State Teachers College (later renamed St. Cloud State University) as a member of the Minnesota Teachers College Conference (MTCC) during the 1946 college football season. Led by head coach Edward M. Colletti, the Huskies compiled a 3–4 record (2–2 against MTCC opponents), tied for third place in the MTCC, and were outscored by a total of 74 to 58.

Moorhead State

The 1946 Moorhead State Dragons football team was an American football team that represented Moorhead State Teachers College (later renamed Minnesota State University Moorhead) as a member of the Minnesota Teachers College Conference (MTCC) during the 1946 college football season. Led by head coach Neil Wohlwend, the Dragons compiled a 2–3–2 record (1–2–1 against MTCC opponents), finished in fifth place in the MTCC, and were outscored by a total of 57 to 46.

Roy Domek and Marco Gotta were assistant coaches.

Winona State

The 1946 Winona State Warriors football team was an American football team that represented Winona State Teachers College (later renamed Winona State University) as a member of the Minnesota Teachers College Conference (MTCC) during the 1946 college football season. Led by head coach Eugene Brodhagen, the Warriors compiled a 0–6 record (0–4 against MTCC opponents), finished in last place in the MTCC, and were outscored by a total of 89 to 25.

It was Winona's  first winless season since 1935.

References

 
Minnesota Teachers College Conference football